Unplanned Parenthood may refer to:

 "Unplanned Parenthood" (House)
 "Unplanned Parenthood", a song by Busdriver from Temporary Forever
 "Unplanned Parenthood", a song by Farrah Abraham from My Teenage Dream Ended